The 21st New York State Legislature, consisting of the New York State Senate and the New York State Assembly, met from January 2 to April 6, 1798, during the third year of John Jay's governorship, in Albany.

Background
Under the provisions of the New York Constitution of 1777, amended by the re-apportionment of March 4, 1796, Senators were elected on general tickets in the senatorial districts for four-year terms. They were divided into four classes, and every year about one fourth of the Senate seats came up for election. Assemblymen were elected countywide on general tickets to a one-year term, the whole assembly being renewed annually.

In March 1786, the Legislature enacted that future Legislatures meet on the first Tuesday of January of each year unless called earlier by the governor. In 1797, Albany was declared the State capital, and all subsequent Legislatures have been meeting there ever since.

On January 24, 1797, State Senator Philip Schuyler was elected to the U.S. Senate, leaving a vacancy in the Eastern District.

In 1797, Delaware County was created from parts of Ulster and Otsego counties, and was apportioned two seats in the Assembly, one each taken from Ulster and Otsego.

At this time the politicians were divided into two opposing political parties: the Federalists and the Democratic-Republicans.

Elections
The State election was held from April 25 to 27, 1797. Senators Ezra L'Hommedieu (Southern D.), Ebenezer Clark, Anthony Ten Eyck, Jacobus Van Schoonhoven (all three Eastern D.), Thomas Morris and Michael Myers (both Western D.) were re-elected. John Addison, Peter Cantine Jr., James G. Graham (all three Middle D.) and Seth Phelps (Western D.) were also elected to full terms in the Senate. Senator Zina Hitchcock (Eastern D.) was re-elected, but only to a two-year term to fill the vacancy.

Sessions
The Legislature met on January 2, 1798, at the Old City Hall in Albany, New York; the Senate adjourned on April 5, the Assembly on April 6.

Federalist Dirck Ten Broeck was elected Speaker with 59 votes against 42 for Dem.-Rep. William Denning.

On January 3, 1798, Philip Schuyler (Fed.) resigned from the U.S. Senate. On January 11, the Legislature elected New York Supreme Court Justice John Sloss Hobart (Fed.) to fill the vacancy. Hobart vacated his seat on April 16, 1798, when he was appointed to the United States District Court for the District of New York, and on May 5 Gov. John Jay appointed William North (Fed.) to the U.S. Senate to fill the vacancy temporarily.

State Senate

Districts
The Southern District (9 seats) consisted of Kings, New York, Queens, Richmond, Suffolk and Westchester counties.
The Middle District (12 seats) consisted of Dutchess, Orange, Ulster, Columbia and Delaware counties.
The Eastern District (11 seats) consisted of Washington, Clinton, Rensselaer, Albany and Saratoga counties.
The Western District (11 seats) consisted of  Montgomery, Herkimer, Ontario, Otsego, Tioga, Onondaga, Schoharie and Steuben counties.

Note: There are now 62 counties in the State of New York. The counties which are not mentioned in this list had not yet been established, or sufficiently organized, the area being included in one or more of the abovementioned counties.

Members
The asterisk (*) denotes members of the previous Legislature who continued in office as members of this Legislature.

Employees
Clerk: Abraham B. Bancker

State Assembly

Districts

Albany County (10 seats)
Clinton County (1 seat)
Columbia County (6 seats)
Delaware County (2 seats)
Dutchess County (10 seats)
Herkimer County (7 seats)
Kings County (1 seat)
Montgomery County (6 seats)
The City and County of New York (13 seats)
Onondaga County (2 seats)
Ontario and Steuben counties (2 seats)
Orange County (3 seats)
Otsego County (4 seats)
Queens County (4 seats)
Rensselaer County (6 seats)
Richmond County (1 seat)
Saratoga County (5 seats)
Schoharie County (1 seat)
Suffolk County (4 seats)
Tioga County (2 seats)
Ulster County (7 seats)
Washington County (6 seats)
Westchester County (5 seats)

Note: There are now 62 counties in the State of New York. The counties which are not mentioned in this list had not yet been established, or sufficiently organized, the area being included in one or more of the abovementioned counties.

Assemblymen
The asterisk (*) denotes members of the previous Legislature who continued as members of this Legislature.

Employees
Clerk: James Van Ingen
Sergeant-at-Arms: Robert Hunter
Doorkeeper: Peter Hansen

Notes

Sources
The New York Civil List compiled by Franklin Benjamin Hough (Weed, Parsons and Co., 1858) [see pg. 108f for Senate districts; pg. 116 for senators; pg. 148f for Assembly districts; pg. 171 for assemblymen]
Election result Assembly, Dutchess Co. at project "A New Nation Votes", compiled by Phil Lampi, hosted by Tufts University Digital Library
Election result Assembly, Montgomery Co. at project "A New Nation Votes"
Election result Assembly, Rensselaer Co. at project "A New Nation Votes"
Election result Assembly, Saratoga Co. at project "A New Nation Votes"
Election result Assembly, Washington Co. at project "A New Nation Votes"
Election result Assembly Speaker at project "A New Nation Votes"

1797 in New York (state)
1798 in New York (state)
021